DWF may refer to:

Design Web Format
Dreamworld Wildlife Foundation
Dudh Sagar Water Falls railway station
DWF Group